The year 716 BC was a year of the pre-Julian Roman calendar. In the Roman Empire, it was known as year 38 Ab urbe condita . The denomination 716 BC for this year has been used since the early medieval period, when the Anno Domini calendar era became the prevalent method in Europe for naming years.

Events
Roman legend marks this as the date that Romulus ended his rule.
 The Sicilian colony of Chersonesos is established (or 717 BC).

Births

Deaths
 Ahaz, king of Judah (or 715 BC)

References

710s BC